Douz is a town in the Kebili Governorate in the south of Tunisia, known as the "gateway to the Sahara."

History
It has been called the "ultimate palm oasis", because it has over 500,000 palm trees in the area, and it is a major producer of "diglat noor" dates. In previous times it was an important stop on the trans-Saharan caravan routes.  Today, it is a destination for tourists who are interested in seeing the desert, and a starting point for desert treks by camel, motorcycle, or four-wheel-drive vehicle.

Culture
Every year Douz hosts the International Festival of the Sahara, a four-day celebration of traditional desert culture. The festival, usually held in November or December, features traditional music and dancing, poetry readings, camel wrestling, and racing of horses and salugis. Douz is home to the Museum of the Sahara, which showcases displays on traditional nomadic desert culture of the Mrazig people who now mostly live a settled life in the town.

Demography
The majority of inhabitants of Douz are from Arab descent (Banu Sulaym) 
Douz is the home of Mrazig people.

Gallery

References

External links

Populated places in Kebili Governorate
Communes of Tunisia